According to the administrative divisions of the People's Republic of China  there are three levels of cities, namely provincial-level (consists of municipalities ), prefecture-level cities, and county-level cities. As of June 2020 the PRC has a total of 687 cities: 4 municipalities, 2 SARs, 293 prefectural-level cities (including the 15 sub-provincial cities) and 388 county-level cities (including the 38 sub-prefectural cities and 10 XXPC cities). This list does not include any cities in the disputed Taiwan Province and portions of Fujian Province (see the List of cities in Taiwan), as these are controlled by the Republic of China and claimed by the PRC under the One-China policy.

Four cities are centrally administered municipalities, which include dense urban areas, suburbs, and large rural areas: Chongqing (28.84 million), Shanghai (23.01 million), Beijing (19.61 million), and Tianjin (12.93 million).

According to 2017 research from the Demographia research group, there are 102 cities governed by the People's Republic of China with an "urban area" population of over 1 million.

List of cities

Contemporary cities
Types of cities

Renamed cities

Dissolved cities

Tier system

The Chinese central government introduced a ranking system in the 1980s to facilitate the staged rollout of infrastructure and urban development throughout the country. Cities were ranked by tier according to the government's development priorities. The tier system began as a bureaucratic classification, but has since the later 1990s acquired new salience from the perspectives of real estate development, commercial vitality and cosmopolitanness, besides the old notions of population, economic size, and political ranking. It has now become a proxy for demographic and social segmentation in China, especially relevant to those college-educated seeking non-governmental employment.

It is the general consensus that four cities, namely Beijing, Shanghai, Guangzhou, Shenzhen, belong to the first tier, while tier II includes other major cities. Small and medium cities are grouped into tier III or IV.

Republic of China (1912–1949)
Note: All names are transliterated in pinyin. 
Fu (府) cities

Shi cities

See also

 List of capitals in China
 List of Chinese prefecture-level cities by GDP
 List of Chinese prefecture-level cities by GDP per capita
 List of cities in China by population
 List of cities in the Republic of China (Taiwan)
 List of fu prefectures of China
 List of villages in China

References

External links
China City Forum
China City Development Institute - academic organization
China Historical Geographic Information System (and Placename Search Engine)

 01
city
China
.C
C